The 1973 Formula 750 season was the first season of the FIM Formula 750 Prize. The series had previously been run as a British competition under ACU rules. Ten races were held over seven rounds. Although disqualified at Silverstone for using a different bike in the second race, Barry Sheene won the championship.

Calendar

 Notes

The Ontario Motor Speedway in California, US was scheduled to hold a round in May 1973. Due to financial difficulties and management changes the event was rescheduled to October. The FIM rules are that a race date cannot be changed once the calendar is ratified so would not sanction the race. The race was therefore run as an AMA Road Race National not a F750 event.

Points system
Points for each event were awarded as below, events at Imola, Silverstone and Hockenheim consisted of two races and points were awarded by aggregate times of the two. At Hockenheim, Jack Findlay won the first race but fell in the second. As there was no aggregate time over the two rounds for him he wasn't awarded points. Suzuki objected and the points awarded were based on positions in each race. 

Only the four best results achieved by a rider counted towards the championship standings.

Championship standings 

 Notes

References

Formula 750
1973 in motorcycle sport